The Spanish Gardener is a 1956 VistaVision and Technicolor film based on the 1950 eponymous novel by A. J. Cronin. The film, which stars Dirk Bogarde and Jon Whiteley, was directed by Philip Leacock.

The adaptation was filmed both at Pinewood Studios near London and in Palamós nearby Mas Juny estate, as well as in S'Agaro, on the Costa Brava, Catalonia. There were also two other adaptations of the story for Brazilian television: Nicholas (1958) and O Jardineiro Espanhol (1967). The film was entered into the 7th Berlin International Film Festival.

The ending of the film differs from that of the book.

Plot
British diplomat Harrington Brande (Michael Hordern) takes up a minor provincial consular post in Spain. The appointment is a disappointment to Harrington, who was hoping for a more senior position. His abandonment by his wife may have adversely affected his career, as might his brusque manner. He is accompanied by his eleven-year-old son, Nicholas (Jon Whiteley), whom he teaches at home, contrary to his friend's advice that the boy would benefit from the social engagement with other boys at a boarding school. Harrington prefers to monopolise his company.

Nicholas sees it as an adventure, and soon becomes friends with the teenage gardener, José (Dirk Bogarde), spending time every day helping him with the plants and relaxing together. The exercise he is getting is much better for him than his father's mollycoddling of the perfectly healthy boy. However, the middle-aged Harrington is jealous of his son's enthusiasm for and friendship with the much younger man. He rebukes his son for taking him to watch Jose play pelota and refuses Jose's gift of fish that he had caught. Similarly, he refuses to let Nicholas join a youth group organized by a junior colleague. He later bans Nicholas and Jose from speaking on pain of Jose's dismissal. He also sets Jose to clear a large rockery as punishment.

While Harrington is away on a business trip, the drunken Garcia, the butler/ chauffeur, threatens Nicholas with a knife and tries to break into his bedroom and the terrified boy takes refuge overnight with Jose with whom he has again been spending time. His father discovers this and is furious. Garcia then frames José by convincing the father that Jose has stolen Nicholas' wristwatch, that Garcia himself had stolen, to cover up his own thieving behaviour.

Jose is arrested and is taken in handcuffs on a train with two armed soldiers guarding him. Brande is on the same train and suddenly realises his fault, but at the same time, Jose jumps from the train. It is initially unclear if he survived the jump.

Brande goes home and discovers his son has run away. He goes to Jose's family, but they have little sympathy, but the old father thinks he knows where they have gone.

On a stormy night Nicholas finds Jose in a derelict old mill, then Brande finds both. Normality is restored and Jose returns to the garden saying, "there is much to do".

Cast
Dirk Bogarde as Jose
Jon Whiteley as Nicholas Brande
Michael Hordern as Harrington Brande
Cyril Cusack as Garcia
Maureen Swanson as Maria
Lyndon Brook as Robert Burton
Josephine Griffin as Carol Burton
Bernard Lee as Leighton Bailey
Rosalie Crutchley as Magdalena
Ina De La Haye as Jose's Mother
Geoffrey Keen as Dr. Harvey
Harold Scott as Pedro
Jack Stewart as a police escort
Richard Molinas as a police escort
Susan Lyall Grant as the maid
John Adderley as the taxi driver
David Lander as the policeman

Reception
The film was one of the most popular at the British box office in 1957.

According to Kinematograph Weekly the film was "in the money" at the British box office in 1957.

References

External links 
The Spanish Gardener at Turner Classic Movies
Variety review
Nicholas  Brazilian telenovela (1958)
O Jardineiro Espanhol  Brazilian telenovela (1967)
Webpage about O Jardineiro Espanhol (in Portuguese)
 

1956 films
Films shot at Pinewood Studios
Films based on British novels
Films set in the 20th century
Films set in Spain
1956 drama films
Films shot in England
Films based on works by A. J. Cronin
Films directed by Philip Leacock
British drama films
1950s English-language films
1950s British films